Polyhomeotic-like protein 2 is a protein that in humans is encoded by the PHC2 gene.

Function 

In Drosophila melanogaster, the 'Polycomb' group (PcG) of genes are part of a cellular memory system that is responsible for the stable inheritance of gene activity. PcG proteins form a large multimeric, chromatin-associated protein complex. The protein encoded by this gene has homology to the Drosophila PcG protein 'polyhomeotic' (Ph) and is known to heterodimerize with EDR1 and colocalize with BMI1 in interphase nuclei of human cells. The specific function in human cells has not yet been determined. Two transcript variants encoding different isoforms have been found for this gene.

Interactions 

PHC2 has been shown to interact with MAPKAPK2, PHC1, BMI1 and MCRS1.

References

Further reading